Babelomurex purpuratus is a species of sea snail, a marine gastropod mollusc in the family Muricidae, the murex snails or rock snails.

Description

Distribution

References

purpuratus
Gastropods described in 1859
Taxa named by Jean-Charles Chenu